The 4cm kanón vz. 36 (i.e., 4 cm Cannon Model 36) was an anti-tank gun produced by the Škoda Works in 1930s. Although firstly two types were being developed- 37 and 47mm- only the larger stayed. It should have been used in two variants Q and L1 while the L1 was the cannon with the vz. 37 machine gun. Only few Q variants were made. Three series of 268, 273 and 200(8.7. 1937, 30.3. 1938, ?.7. 1938 - date of orders) cannons were ordered, but only the first delivered. It was used in Czechoslovak border fortifications and after German occupation of Czechoslovakia it saw service in Atlantic Wall fortifications under the designation 4,7 cm Pak K 36(t).

References
 Janoušek, Jiří. Československé dělostřelectvo 1918-1939, Corona, 2007. 
 https://www.bunkry.cz/clanek/1259 - inczech only

World War II anti-tank guns of Germany
47 mm artillery
Artillery of Czechoslovakia
Military equipment introduced in the 1930s